The Soldiers Delight Natural Environment Area, consists of about  of land in Baltimore County, Maryland, USA. 
 Much of the area of the Soldiers Delight NEA contains a serpentine barren that contains a number of rare and endangered species of plants. 

The following list of clubmosses, spikemosses, horsetails and ferns comes from the publications by [F] Fleming et al. 1995, [M] Monteferrante 1973, [R] Reed 1984, [We] Wennerstrom 1995, and the unpublished data by [Wo] Worthley 1955-1985.

Division Lycopodiophyta
Lycopodiaceae (Clubmoss Family)

Diphasiastrum digitatum  - Northern running-pine, Flat-stemmed clubmoss, Ground cedar [We, Wo]
Diphasiastrum tristachyum  - Blue clubmoss, Blue ground-cedar [Wo]
Huperzia lucidula  - Shining firmoss, Shining clubmoss [Wo]
Lycopodium clavatum  - Stag's-horn clubmoss, Ground pine [Wo]
Lycopodium obscurum  - Groundpine, Tree clubmoss [We, Wo]

Selaginellaceae (Spikemoss Family)

Selaginella apoda  - Meadow spikemoss [M, R, Wo]

Division Equisetophyta
Equisetaceae (Horsetail Family)

Equisetum arvense  - Common horsetail [R, Wo]
Equisetum hyemale  - Scouring rush, Rough horsetail [Wo]
Equisetum sylvaticum  - Wood horsetail [R] {G5, Si, E}

Division Polypodiophyta
Aspleniaceae (Spleenwort Family)

Asplenium platyneuron  - Ebony spleenwort [M, R, Wo]

Dennstaediaceae (Bracken Family)

Dennstaedtia punctilobula  - Hay-scented fern [M, R, We, Wo]
Pteridium aquilinum  - Bracken [R, Wo]

Dryopteridaceae (Wood fern Family)

Athyrium filix-femina  - Lady fern [Wo]
Athyrium filix-femina  - Southern lady fern [M]
Cystopteris fragilis  - Brittle fern, Bladder fern [Wo]
Deparia acrostichoides  - Silvery Spleenwort [Wo]
Dryopteris carthusiana  - Spinulose shield fern, Narrow buckler fern [Wo]
Dryopteris cristata  - Crested wood fern, Crested buckler fern [Wo]
Dryopteris marginalis  - Marginal shield fern, Marginal wood fern [R, Wo]
Onoclea sensibilis  - Sensitive fern [Wo, We]
Polystichum acrostichoides  - Christmas fern [M, R, We, Wo]
Woodsia obtusa  - Blunt-lobed woodsia [Wo]

Ophioglossaceae (Adder's-tongue Family)

Botrychium virginianum  - Rattlesnake fern [Wo]
Sceptridium dissectum  - Dissected grapefern [Wo]

Osmundaceae (Royal fern Family)
Osmunda cinnamomea  - Cinnamon fern [M, Wo]
Osmunda claytoniana  - Interrupted fern [R, Wo]
Osmunda regalis L. var. spectabilis  - Royal fern [Wo]

Polypodiaceae (Polypody Family)
Polypodium virginianum  - Common polypody [R, Wo]

Pteridaceae (Maidenhair fern Family)
Adiantum pedatum  - Northern naidenhair fern [Wo]

Thelypteridaceae (Marsh fern Family)

Parathelypteris noveboracensis  - New York fern [Wo]
Phegopteris hexagonoptera  - Broad beech fern [R]

See also

Soldiers Delight Natural Environmental Area plant lists
List of graminoids of Soldiers Delight
List of lichens of Soldiers Delight
List of woody plants of Soldiers Delight
List of wildflowers of Soldiers Delight

Related flora articles
Lichens of Maryland
Ferns of West Virginia
Index: Plant communities of Maryland

References

Brown, Melvin L. and Russell G. Brown. 1984. Herbaceous Plants of Maryland. Port City Press, Inc., Baltimore, Maryland, 1127 pages.
Davis, Charles A. 2004. List of Plants of Soldier's Delight. (Unpublished).
Flora of North America Editorial Committee. 1993. Flora of North America. Volume 2. Pteridophytes and Gymnosperms. Oxford University Press. New York and Oxford, 475 pages.
Gleason, Henry A., and Arthur Cronquist. 1991. Manual of Vascular Plants of Northeastern United States and Adjacent Canada. (Second Edition) The New York Botanical Garden, Bronx, New York 10458, 910 pages.
Google Hybrid Map. 2006. Target building, Soldiers Delight Visitor Center. 
Holmgren, Noel H. 1998. Illustrated Companion to Gleason and Cronquist's Manual. Illustrations of the Vascular Plants of Northeastern U. S. and Adjacent Canada. The New York Botanical Garden, Bronx, New York 10458, 937 pages.
Maryland Department of Natural Resources. 2003. Explanation of Rank and Status Codes. 
Maryland Department of Natural Resources. 2004. Current and Historical Rare, Threatened, and Endangered Species of Baltimore County, Maryland. 
[M]   Monteferrante, Frank. 1973. A Phytosociological Study of Soldiers Delight, Baltimore County, Maryland. Towson State College, Towson, Maryland.
[R]   Reed, Clyde F. 1984. Floras of the Serpentinite Formations in Eastern North America, with descriptions of geomorphology and mineralogy of the formations. Reed Herbarium, Baltimore, Maryland.
Uebel, Edward C. 2000. Maryland Bryophytes Collected by Elmer G. Worthley. The Maryland Native Plant Society, P.O. Box 4877, Silver Spring, Maryland 20914, 100 pages.
[We]   Wennerstrom, Jack. 1995. Soldiers Delight Journal - Exploring a Globally Rare Ecosystem. University of Pittsburgh Press, Pittsburg and London, 247 pages.
[Wo]   Worthley, Elmer G. 1955-1985. List of Plants of Soldier's Delight. Unpublished.

External links

Maryland Dept. Natural Resources — "Guide to the Soldiers Delight Natural Environmental Area"

.Soldiers Delight
Ferns
Soldiers Delight related
Ferns of the Americas